Gnoheré Krizo (born 20 June 1997) is an Ivorian professional footballer who plays as a forward for Calcutta Football League club Bhawanipore.

Club career
Krizo started his career in Belarus with FC Slutsk. After an unsuccessful stint in Moldova, he moved in January 2017, to Uzbek League champions Lokomotiv Tashkent. He only made 2 appearances for the club, and left the club in January 2018.

Real Kashmir
For the 2018–19 season, Krizo joined Indian I-League club Real Kashmir FC. He broke into the first team, and scored 4 goals in 16 games in his first season. The club also took him for the next season till 2020 and he also played in tournaments like Durand Cup and played against Jamshedpur FC in a pre-season friendly.

Churchill Brothers 
Krizo joined Churchill Brothers during the 2021–21 season and scored his first goal on 1 April 2022 in their 4–2 win over NEROCA in the I-League. His second goal came as a winner against RoundGlass Punjab on 3 May in his team's 2–1 win. Krizo came in as substitute and scored from close range in the 85th minute.

Career statistics

Club

Honours
Bhawanipore
Naihati Gold Cup: 2022
CFL Premier Division A runner-up: 2022

References

External links

Profile at CAF Online
Profile at FC Slutsk website

1997 births
Living people
Ivorian footballers
Association football forwards
Ivorian expatriate footballers
Expatriate footballers in Belarus
Expatriate footballers in Moldova
Expatriate footballers in Uzbekistan
Expatriate footballers in India
FC Slutsk players
FC Saxan players
PFC Lokomotiv Tashkent players
Real Kashmir FC players
I-League players
Churchill Brothers FC Goa players